Léon Abrami (1 July 1879 – 5 January 1939) was a French politician.

Abrami was born in Istanbul, Ottoman Empire. He represented the Democratic Republican Alliance (from 1914 to 1924) and the Independent Radicals (from 1924 to 1928 and from 1932 to 1936) in the Chamber of Deputies.

He had a twin brother, Pierre Abrami, who was a physician.

References

1879 births
1939 deaths
Emigrants from the Ottoman Empire to France
Democratic Republican Alliance politicians
Independent Radical politicians
Members of the 11th Chamber of Deputies of the French Third Republic
Members of the 12th Chamber of Deputies of the French Third Republic
Members of the 13th Chamber of Deputies of the French Third Republic
Members of the 15th Chamber of Deputies of the French Third Republic